The medial sural cutaneous nerve (L4-S3) is a sensory nerve of the leg. It supplies cutaneous innervation the posteromedial leg.

Structure 
The medial sural cutaneous nerve originates from the posterior aspect of the tibial nerve of the sciatic nerve. It descends between the two heads of the gastrocnemius muscle. Around the middle of the back of the leg, it pierces the deep fascia to become superficial. It unites with the lateral sural cutaneous nerve to form the sural nerve.

Morphometric properties

According to a large cadaveric study in which 208 sural nerves were dissected in their native position (by Steele et al.) the medial sural cutaneous nerve was consistently present in most lower extremities. This information aligns with other research as well. Only one sample in Steele et al. did not contain a medial sural cutaneous nerve. The diameter (at the medial sural cutaneous nerve origin) is found to be 2.74mm ± 0.93 (2.62–2.86) in 207 samples. Two new variations (as of 2021) of the sural nerve complex were observed where the MSCN is observed to travel to the lateral ankle and provides the branches for the lateral calcaneal nerves of the lateral ankle. Normally the sural nerve serves this purpose.

Additional images

References

External links
Referenced papers:
 Steele et al. 208 sample cadaveric review 2021
 Ramakrishnan et al.systematic review on sural nerve formation 2015

Anatomy web references
 
 
 Cutaneous field

Nerves of the lower limb and lower torso